The 1971 Pioneer Bowl was a college football bowl game in Texas, played between the Louisiana Tech Bulldogs and Eastern Michigan Hurons at Memorial Stadium in Wichita Falls. The inaugural edition of the Pioneer Bowl, it was one of four regional finals in the College Division played on December 11.

Game summary

Scoring summary

Statistics

References

Pioneer Bowl
Pioneer Bowl
Eastern Michigan Eagles football bowl games
Louisiana Tech Bulldogs football bowl games
Pioneer Bowl